Fluoride volatility is the tendency of highly fluorinated molecules to vaporize at comparatively low temperatures. Heptafluorides, hexafluorides and pentafluorides have much lower boiling points than the lower-valence fluorides. Most difluorides and trifluorides have high boiling points, while most tetrafluorides and monofluorides fall in between.   The term "fluoride volatility" is jargon used particularly in the context of separation of radionuclides.

Volatility and valence

Valences for the majority of elements are based on the highest known fluoride.

Roughly, fluoride volatility can be used to remove elements with a valence of 5 or greater: uranium, neptunium, plutonium, metalloids (tellurium, antimony), nonmetals (selenium), halogens (iodine, bromine), and the middle transition metals (niobium, molybdenum, technetium, ruthenium, and possibly rhodium). This fraction includes the actinides most easily reusable as nuclear fuel in a thermal reactor, and the two long-lived fission products best suited to disposal by transmutation, Tc-99 and I-129, as well as Se-79.

Noble gases (xenon, krypton) are volatile even without fluoridation, and will not condense except at much lower temperatures.

Left behind are alkali metals (caesium, rubidium), alkaline earth metals (strontium, barium), lanthanides, the remaining actinides (americium, curium), remaining transition metals (yttrium, zirconium, palladium, silver) and post-transition metals (tin, indium, cadmium). This fraction contains the fission products that are radiation hazards on a scale of decades (Cs-137, Sr-90, Sm-151), the four remaining long-lived fission products Cs-135, Zr-93, Pd-107, Sn-126 of which only the last emits strong radiation, most of the neutron poisons, and the higher actinides (americium, curium, californium) that are radiation hazards on a scale of hundreds or thousands of years and are difficult to work with because of gamma radiation but are fissionable in a fast reactor.

Reprocessing methods

Uranium oxides react with fluorine to form gaseous uranium hexafluoride, most of the plutonium reacts to form gaseous plutonium hexafluoride, a majority of fission products (especially electropositive elements: lanthanides, strontium, barium, yttrium, caesium) form nonvolatile fluorides. Few metals in the fission products (the transition metals niobium, ruthenium, technetium, molybdenum, and the halogen iodine) form volatile (boiling point <200 °C) fluorides that accompany the uranium and plutonium hexafluorides, together with inert gases. Distillation is then used to separate the uranium hexafluoride from the mixture.

The nonvolatile alkaline fission products and minor actinides is most suitable for further processing with 'dry' electrochemical processing (pyrochemical) non-aqueous methods. The lanthanide fluorides are difficult to dissolve in the nitric acid used for aqueous reprocessing methods, such as PUREX, DIAMEX and SANEX, which use solvent extraction. Fluoride volatility is only one of several pyrochemical processes designed to reprocess used nuclear fuel.

The Řež nuclear research institute at Řež in the Czech Republic tested screw dosers that fed ground uranium oxide (simulating used fuel pellets) into a fluorinator where the particles were burned in fluorine gas to form uranium hexafluoride.

Hitachi has developed a technology, called FLUOREX, which combines fluoride volatility, to extract uranium, with more traditional solvent extraction (PUREX), to extract plutonium and other transuranics]. The FLUOREX-based fuel cycle is intended for use with the Reduced moderation water reactor.

Table of relevant properties

See also

FLiNaK
Molten salt reactor

Notes

Missing top fluorides:
PrF4 (because it decomposes at 90 °C)
TbF4 (because it decomposes at 300 °C)
CeF4 (because it decomposes at 600 °C)
Without stable fluorides: Kr, Xe, Pd

References

External links
Study of Electrochemical Processes for Separation of the Actinides and Lanthanides in Molten Fluoride Media (PDF)

Low-pressure distillation of a portion of the fuel carrier salt from the Molten Salt Reactor Experiment (PDF)
Use of the Fluoride Volatility Process to Extract Technetium from Transmuted Spent Nuclear Fuel (PDF)
A Peer Review of the Strategy for Characterizing Transuranics and Technetium Contamination in Depleted Uranium Hexafluoride Tails Cylinders (PDF)
PHYSICAL CONSTANTS OF INORGANIC COMPOUNDS (PDF)

Nuclear reprocessing
Nuclear chemistry
Fluorides